Etymological Dictionary of the Russian Language may refer to:

 by Aleksandr Preobrazhensky (1910–1916) 
 by Max Vasmer (1938-1950 in German as Russisches etymologisches Wörterbuch, 1959–1961 in Russian)
 by Moscow State University (1963-)

See also
Etymological Dictionary of Slavic Languages